Sylvia Elizabeth Lucas (born 22 April 1964) is the current Deputy Chairperson of the National Council of Provinces in the Republic of South Africa, after having taken office on 23 May 2019. From 2013 to 2019, she served as the 4th Premier of the Northern Cape Province. She was elected and inaugurated as the successor to Hazel Jenkins. Lucas briefly served as acting premier and before her appointment, as the MEC for Environmental Affairs in the Northern Cape Provincial Government.

Education and career
She was born on 22 April 1964, and grew up in Upington in the Northern Cape. Lucas attended the Carlton Van Heerden High School in Upington where in the early 1980s, she first became involved in political activities.

She later took part in the Rosedale rent boycotts, and was part of the delegation to the Transitional Council, to ensure the provision of prepaid electricity to communities when they could not afford conventional electrical power.

Lucas is a former typist for the National Party who joined the ANC in 1992.
Sylvia Lucas joined the African National Congress (ANC) as an ordinary branch member in 1992. From 1995 to 2000, Lucas served as a councillor for the //Khara Hais Local Municipality, in Upington, while serving in regional structures of the ANC in the area.  She served as the first female chairperson of the ANC in the Siyanda region from 2001 to 2004.

In 2000, Lucas was elected to serve in the Northern Cape Provincial Legislature. Secretary-General of the ANC, Kgalema Motlanthe, announced in 2003, that Lucas's name was fourth on the ANC candidate list for the Northern Cape Provincial Legislature.

In 2004, she was elected on the provincial executive committee of the ANC in the Northern Cape. She had also meanwhile risen through the ranks of the ANC Women's League, acting as provincial secretary following the resignation of Maykie Dipuo. This position made her an ex officio member of the league's national executive committee. By 2007, as deputy provincial chairwoman of the Women's League. In 2009, she was appointed as the MEC for Environment and Nature Conservation in the Northern Cape.

Lucas participated in ANC international study tours in the United Kingdom, Canada and the United States.

Premier of the Northern Cape

Afte premier Hazel Jenkins collapsed, suffering a stroke, in 2012, the Executive Council of the Province appointed Grizelda Cjiekella as acting premier for the duration of Premier Jenkins' incapacity leave. When, a year later, Hazel Jenkins stepped down from the post of Premier of the Northern Cape, it was Sylvia Lucas whom the ANC in the province announced, on 19 April 2013, as the premier's successor. On the date set for Lucas's inauguration as premier, however, the motion to recognise Jenkins' stepping down was opposed on procedural grounds. A vote in the Northern Cape legislature on 30 April 2013, in which opposition parties COPE and the Democratic Alliance took part, failed to achieve the required two-thirds support for the motion to be carried. Accordingly, Jenkins technically remained premier and Lucas was sworn in on the same day as Grizelda Cjiekella's successor as acting premier of the province.

When Hazel Jenkins subsequently resigned, with effect from 22 May 2013, the move towards inaugurating her successor was possible. Lucas was officially elected and sworn in as premier of the province on 23 May 2013. She delivered her inaugural speech as premier on 30 May 2013.

Lucas was re-appointed premier on 20 May 2014, by the National Executive Committee of the African National Congress, following South Africa's 7 May 2014 general election. She was the only woman appointed as a premier in the eight ANC-run provinces.

Lucas left the office in May 2019 to become the Deputy Chairperson of the National Council of Provinces. Zamani Saul was designated as her successor.

Controversies

"Fast Food Premier"
Premier Lucas came under media scrutiny when it was revealed that she spent R53,000 ($) on fast food and personal groceries, with her government-issued credit card, in the first ten weeks of her taking up the post.  This was calculated to be an average spend of R760 ($), a point that was speedily picked up upon by the official Democratic Alliance opposition.

The Premier defended her high charges by remarking, "How would we have eaten if we didn't use taxpayers' money?"  The ANC later weighed in, defending the Premier, and lashed out against the various political and editorial cartoonists that had lampooned her in print media – particularly against notorious cartoonist, Jonathan Shapiro. She became popularly nicknamed the "Fast Food Premier" in media reports and newspaper headlines.

External links
 Premier Sylvia Lucs spends 50k of Tax payers's money on fast food in 2 Months
 Acting Premier Sylvia Lucas's speech following her swearing-in on 30 April 2013
 Address by the Premier of the Northern Cape Province, Ms Sylvia Lucas, on the occasion of the tabling of Budget Vote 1, at the Northern Cape Provincial Legislature, 30 May 2013

References

1964 births
Living people
People from Upington
African National Congress politicians
Premiers of the Northern Cape
Women premiers of South African provinces
Members of the Northern Cape Provincial Legislature
21st-century South African politicians
21st-century South African women politicians
Members of the National Council of Provinces